Camperdown was an electoral district of the Legislative Assembly in the Australian state of New South Wales, created in the 1904 re-distribution of electorates following the 1903 New South Wales referendum, which required the number of members of the Legislative Assembly to be reduced from 125 to 90. It consisted of parts of Annandale and the abolished seats of Darlington, Newtown-Camperdown and Newtown-Erskine. It was named after and included the inner Sydney suburb of Camperdown. In 1920, with the introduction of proportional representation, it was absorbed into the multi-member electorate of Balmain.

Members for Camperdown

Election results

References

Former electoral districts of New South Wales
Constituencies established in 1904
1904 establishments in Australia
Constituencies disestablished in 1920
1920 disestablishments in Australia